Khosrow Hassanzadeh (born 1963 in Tehran) is an Iranian painter. He is known for his "Terrorist" collection.

Life and career

Hassanzadeh was born in 1963 in Tehran, to a working class Azerbaijani family who were fruit-sellers. He was just 17 years when the Iran-Iraq war broke out, and he dropped out of school and enlisted in the Basiji militia, but was subsequently obliged to remain as a conscript. When he returned from the war, he chose to work on themes that reflected his experiences of war.

Following his return to civilian life, he studied art, enrolling in the Mojtama-e-Honar University (1989–91) where he studied painting and later at the Persian Literature at Azad University (1995–99), both in Tehran. His art teachers advised him to "draw small" so that his work would be marketable, but he ignored this advice. From the outset, he was determined to paint large murals and posters.

He first exhibited in the 1980s, but only gained international recognition with War (1998), a grim and trenchant diary of his own experiences as a volunteer soldier during the Iran-Iraq war (1980–1988). In Ashura (2000) a 'women-friendly' interpretation of the most revered Shiite religious ceremony, he depicted chador-clad women engulfed by religious iconography. Chador (2001) and Prostitutes (2002) continued his exploration of sociological themes particular to Iran's hyper-gendered urban landscape. The latter paintings used police mug shots to pay tribute to sixteen prostitutes killed by a serial killer in Mashhad, a religious capital of Iran. The paintings were created after filmmaker Maziar Bahari commissioned Hassanzadeh to create a poster for his film, And Along Came a Spider. In Terrorist (2004) the artist questions the concept of 'terrorism' in international politics by portraying himself, his mother and sisters as 'terrorists'.

Unlike many of his contemporaries who have left Iran, Hassanzadeh has chosen to continue to live and work as an artist in Iran. He is currently based in Tehran, where he works as an actor, visual artist and ceramist. His work featured in many exhibitions in Europe and the Middle East. Time magazine described him as one of the country's "hottest" artists.

Work

His works often deal with issues that are considered sensitive in Iranian society and therefore he is frequently referred to as a 'political' artist or 'pop' artist. Scholars have described his style as somewhere between dissident and regime art. The artist, himself, calls his work "people's art"  because it deals with social issues that affect everyday people. His work is influenced by the Saqqa Kaneh movement and traditional Iranian art.

He has had solo shows in Amsterdam, Beirut, Dubai, London, Phnom Penh, and Tehran. His work is held by the British Museum, the Tehran Museum of Contemporary Art, the World Bank and the Tropenmuseum. Hassanzadeh works primarily with painting, silkscreen, mosaics and mixed media.

Select list of works
 Early  Paintings, series, 1988–1998  
  Mother, pastel on paper, series, 1988  
 Do I Have to Sign, oil on canvas, 180 X 120 cm, 1999 
 Ashoura installation (collaboration with Sadegh Tirakhan), exhibited at TMOCA, Summer, 2001 
 Terrorist, a four piece series, 2004 
  Ya Mi  Modal, silkscreen and oil on paper, 200 x 200 cm, 2008 <ref>"In the Mood for Paper, Art and AsiaPacific Quarterly Journal, No. 64-65, p. 51</ref>
 Ready to Order, mixed media, 215 X 135 X 28 cm,  2009 
 Dome mosaic, ceramic plate, 2010 
 Remember, mixed media on ceramic tile, 2010 

Literature
Shatanawi, Mirjam, Tehran Studio Works. The Art of Khosrow Hassanzadeh. London: Saqi Books, 2007.
Shatanawi, Mirjam, 'The disquieting art of Khosrow Hassanzadeh', in: ISIM Review 18, Autumn 2006, pp. 54–55.

 See also
 Islamic art
 Iranian art
 List of Iranian artists

References

External links
  Examples of Khosrow's work at Nafas art magazine

Further reading
 Mirjam Shatanawi, Tehran Studio Works: The Art of Khosrow Hassanzadeh,'' Saqi Books, 2007 (in Persian and English)

Iranian painters
People from Tehran
1963 births
Living people
Iranian Azerbaijanis